In Downtown Atlanta, the Downtown Connector or 75/85 (pronounced "seventy-five eighty-five") is the concurrent section of Interstate 75 and Interstate 85 through the core of the city. Beginning at the I-85/Langford Parkway interchange, the Downtown Connector runs generally due north, meeting the west–east I-20 in the middle. Just north of this is the Grady Curve around Grady Memorial Hospital. Continuing north, the terminus of the Downtown Connector is the Brookwood Interchange or Brookwood Split in the Brookwood area of the city. Since the 2000s, it has been officially named James Wendell George Parkway for most of its length, although it is still designated the Connector in the mainstream. It also has unsigned designations State Route 401 (I-75) and State Route 403 (I-85) along its length, due to I-75 and I-85 having 400-series reference numbers.

Route description

The Downtown Connector carries more than 437,000 vehicles per day at its busiest point — just south of 10th Street in Midtown, while the least traveled portion carries 243,000 vehicles per day — just south of Fulton Street, near the interchange with Interstate 20. The area around the connector and associated interchanges are considered one of the ten-most congested stretches of interstate in the U.S. Due to this fact, many motorists often compare Atlanta to Los Angeles, which is also known for its notoriously-congested freeway system.

The highway is fully instrumented with Intelligent transportation system (ITS) devices. There are more than 25 closed-circuit television cameras between the Langford Parkway interchange (south end) and the Brookwood Interchange (north end). Additionally, the Downtown Connector has three large overhead electronic message signs, and four smaller HOV-dedicated message signs on the median barrier wall. Traffic flow data is gathered through a video detection system, using pole-mounted black-and-white cameras spaced every  on both sides of the roadway. All video and data is fed into the GDOT's Transportation Management Center (TMC), via fiber optic cable located under the shoulders of the roadway. Virtually all entrance ramps are metered, with the exception of the freeway-to-freeway connection ramps from I-20. As with every other freeway inside the Perimeter, the Downtown Connector is lined with streetlights mounted in the center median, with high-mast lighting at major interchanges.

Atlanta's skyline, both Downtown and Midtown, can be seen from the highway, especially at the northern and southern ends.

History

Planning and initial construction
On December 14, 1944, the Georgia State Highway Department, the predecessor agency to the Georgia Department of Transportation (GDOT), collaborated with the city of Atlanta, Fulton County, and the Bureau of Public Roads (BPR), the predecessor to the Federal Highway Administration (FHWA) to work on a plan to improve traffic and connectivity within the Atlanta area. Chicago-based H.W. Lochner & Company, a transportation engineering firm which had been formed earlier that year, was hired to provide a comprehensive transportation plan for the region, using data conducted by the BPR and the state highway department from 1936 to 1945, and future growth projections. The report, which was released on January 10, 1946, recommended a total of six radiating expressways be constructed in the city, with the intent of being integrated into what later became the Interstate Highway System, which at the time was expected to eventually be authorized by Congress. The report recommended that four of these expressways converge into a single north-south route through downtown, which was referred to at the time as both the "Downtown Connector" and the "Downtown Connector Expressway".

Work of the first section of the Downtown Connector, located between Williams Street and the Brookwood Interchance, as well as the approximately  stretch of what is now I-85 north to Peachtree Street, began in September 1948, and was dedicated and opened to traffic on September 25, 1951. The  stretch from Piedmont Avenue to Williams Street opened on May 5, 1959. Work on a southern stretch of the Connector, a  section between University Avenue and Richardson Street, began in March 1955, and was dedicated and opened on July 25, 1957. Construction on the final stretch, the  stretch between Richardson Street and Piedmont Avenue, including the interchange with I-20, began on February 26, 1962, and was opened to traffic on September 18, 1964. A ribbon-cutting ceremony for the Downtown Connector, attended by Governor Carl Sanders, FHWA administrator Rex Marion Whitton, and Atlanta mayor Ivan Allen Jr. was held inside the Georgia State Capitol on October 15, 1964.

Initial construction of the highway displaced parts of Techwood Drive and Williams Street in Midtown Atlanta. It also destroyed street grids east and south of downtown, dividing Sweet Auburn in two and the interchange with I-20 leveling the northern part of the Washington-Rawson district. The proposed I-485 was originally planned by the Georgia Department of Transportation to carry some south–north traffic through the eastern side of the city, but most of this was canceled in the 1970s by the then-governor of Georgia, Jimmy Carter. Parts of that road are now I-675 and SR 400.

Reconstruction
The highway was heavily reconstructed during the 1980s as part of GDOT's Freeing the Freeways program to widen Atlanta-area freeways, with most of the Connector's width being doubled from three to six or seven lanes in each direction. The project included work to increase lanes from six to eight on I-20, I-75, I-85, and I-285 ("The Perimeter"), as well as ten lanes on the downtown connector, involving 126 total miles and was phased over 13 years between 1976 and 1988. The improvement campaign also included elimination of sharp curves and grades, left-hand exits, excessive interchanges, and short acceleration/deceleration lanes.

So as to offer a bypass around construction through the center of the city, the perimeter road (I-285) was completed first. The radiating expressways were then upgraded, and the last phase was reconstruction of the depressed sections through downtown Atlanta. By June 1983, some $252 million in discretionary funds had been used to complete most of the highways save for some major interchanges and the downtown section. The eight miles of the downtown section, which includes the 4.4-mile long downtown connector, was the most complicated section of the entire reconstruction. Work was started on it in 1984, and it included redesigning the massive interchange between I-20 and I-75/85 at Memorial Drive where much of the mileage was on structure. The downtown connector was to be widened to ten lanes, and this required quite a bit of right of way acquisition. Many bridges, including the 55 over the connector portion alone, had to be designed and built. In addition to the general-purpose lanes, provisions for high-occupancy vehicle (HOV) lanes and dedicated on-ramps at Williams Street, Piedmont Avenue, and Memorial Drive were built, and were subsequently converted to HOV usage in 1996.

Later history
Between 2000 and 2004, the six-lane wide 17th Street Bridge was constructed over the Brookwood Interchange, connecting Midtown Atlanta with the then-new Atlantic Station development. In 2008, reconstruction of the 14th Street Bridge took place in order to accommodate increased traffic flow and pedestrian amenities. This work also included the construction of two new off-ramps: a southbound ramp to 10th Street, and a northbound ramp to 17th Street. This work was completed on May 28, 2010.

In early January 2010, a section of the highway between 14th and 17th streets developed an unusual problem dubbed "phantom ice" during a prolonged cold wave that kept temperatures below freezing for several days in the Atlanta region. GDOT engineers believe that heavy rain in previous months raised the water table and caused it to seep upward through joints between lanes, where it subsequently froze. Commuter traffic was stopped briefly on at least two days in order to treat it with deicing materials and inspect the freeway to determine the cause.

In January 2016, GDOT started a study of the Downtown Connector. Citing high levels of congestion that occur outside of peak periods, the purpose of the study is to gather data and explore options for reducing congestion. Data collection took place all year in 2016, and the data is being analyzed and options evaluated throughout 2017 and 2018. The study is expected to be completed in 2019. The study has already released their data on their website, including nine "Hot Spots", or dangerous and congested points that could most benefit from design improvements, and a detailed analysis of traffic in the whole metro area and how it relates to traffic on the Downtown Connector.

The Stitch 

In August 2016, Central Atlanta Progress announced plans to cover the Downtown Connector, converting it to a subterranean roadway and building a series of greenspaces on top of the road, similar to Klyde Warren Park in Dallas. This project was drafted by Jacobs Engineering Group and is called "The Stitch", as one of the intents of the project would be to "stitch" together roads that had been divided with the creation of the Downtown Connector. As of 2019, the project was still in the pre-construction phase, with an estimated timeline and budget of ten years and $452 million, respectively. In 2021, the Midtown Connector Project (MCP) Foundation released a proposal to build a park over 10 blocks of the Midtown portion of the Downtown Connector from North Avenue to 10th Street.

Gallery

Exit list
Exit numbers follow the mileposts along I-75.

References

External links

 Near real-time traffic image of I-75/85 near Tenth St
 Near real-time traffic image of I-75/85 near North Ave/Georgia Tech
 Near real-time traffic image of I-75/85 near Grady Hosp
 Near real-time traffic image of I-75/85 south of University Ave 
 Jack Etheridge Photographs, 1961-1962 of the downtown connector from the Atlanta History Center

Roads in Atlanta
Interstate 75
Interstate 85
Transportation in Fulton County, Georgia
Freeways in the United States
1952 establishments in Georgia (U.S. state)